The Young People's Learning Agency for England, commonly referred to as the Young People's Learning Agency (YPLA), was a UK government body, based in Coventry, which funded further education for 16- to 19-year-olds in England. It closed on 31 March 2012, when its responsibilities were transferred to the newly created Education Funding Agency.

History
The YPLA was established by the Apprenticeships, Skills, Children and Learning Act 2009. On 1 April 2010 it replaced the Learning and Skills Council (LSC), which was the UK's largest non-departmental public body or quango.  Other statutory powers and duties previously within the remit of the LSC were transferred to the Skills Funding Agency and local authorities in England.

Under the Education Act 2011 the YPLA ceased to exist on 31 March 2012. Some statutory responsibilities reverted to the Secretary of State for Education, while many of the YPLA's functions were transferred to the newly created Education Funding Agency.

Function
The YPLA funded provision of further education for 16–19 year olds in England, including education delivered by academies, further education colleges and sixth-form colleges.

Structure
It was a non-departmental public body of the Department for Education.

Regions
 East Midlands - Meridian Business Park, Braunstone Town, Leicestershire
 East of England - Ipswich
 London - Great Smith Street, London
 North East - Team Valley, Gateshead
 North West - Arndale Centre, Manchester
 South East - Guildford
 South West - Bristol and Plymouth
 West Midlands - Birmingham
 Yorkshire and the Humber - Bradford

See also
 Higher Education Funding Council for England
 Education in England

References

External links
 YPLA
 Digital Education Resource Archive (DERA) holds an archive of some digitized YPLA publications.

Video clips
 FE News YouTube channel

Defunct non-departmental public bodies of the United Kingdom government
Department for Education
Funding bodies of England
Further education colleges in England
Government agencies established in 2010
Internships
Organisations based in Coventry
Sixth form colleges in England
Vocational education in the United Kingdom
2010 establishments in England
2012 disestablishments in England